Vargeh Saran (also Romanized as Vargeh Sarān; also known as Varkeh Sarān, Dargeh Sarān, and Dargah Sarān) is a village in the Central District of Sareyn County, Ardabil Province, Iran. At the 2006 census, its population was 618 in 140 families.

References 

Towns and villages in Sareyn County